Mogote is a term referring to an isolated, steep-sided hill.

Mogote or Mogotes may also refer to:

 Mogote, Colorado, a community in the United States
 Mogote de Bagaces, also known as Guayabo de Bagaces, in Costa Rica
 Mogotes, a town and municipality in the Santander Department, Colombia